Sir John Alexander Atkinson KCB, DFC (9 June 1919 – 8 August 2015) was a Royal Air Force officer of the Second World War who later had a distinguished career in the British civil service.

References 

1919 births
2015 deaths
British civil servants
Knights Commander of the Order of the Bath
Recipients of the Distinguished Flying Cross (United Kingdom)
Royal Air Force officers
Alumni of The Queen's College, Oxford
Civil servants in the Ministry of National Service
Civil servants in the Cabinet Office
Civil servants in the Ministry of Pensions and National Insurance
Private secretaries in the British Civil Service